Qutub Shah's Mosque or Sultan Qutbuddin Masjid is a medieval mosque in Ahmedabad, India.

History

It was raised in 1446 by Sultan Qutb-ud-din Ahmad Shah II during the reign of his father Sultan Muhammad Shah II. It is a large heavy building with Hindu architecture elements.

References 

Mosques in Ahmedabad
Religious buildings and structures completed in 1446
Monuments of National Importance in Gujarat